Guido Gravina (born in Turin 10 June 1992) is an Italian male rower, two-time world under 23 champion and winner of medals at senior level at the World Rowing Championships and European Rowing Championships. He also won three Italian Rowing Championships. Sports director at Reale Società Canottieri Cerea since March 2018. Under his direction the Reale Società Canottieri Cerea has won 14 italian championships, 2 gold at the world championships, 3 gold at the european championships, 1 gold at the youth olympic games and other 9 medals at the world and european rowing championships

References

External links
 

1992 births
Living people
Sportspeople from Turin
Italian male rowers
World Rowing Championships medalists for Italy